João Cutileiro OSE (26 June 1937 – 5 January 2021) was a Portuguese sculptor. He is responsible for a number of controversial female nudes in marble.

Life 

Cutileiro was born and died in Lisbon. He was the creator of several pieces of modern public sculpture, most famous being his statue of Sebastian of Portugal, inaugurated in 1973, in Lagos, in the Algarve. His work marks the end of the academic historical sculpture of the Estado Novo dictatorship and the beginning of a new era of contemporaneity in the Portuguese public sculpture.

Works

Exhibitions (selection)

Solo exhibitions
 João Cutileiro, Unikat-Galerie, Wuppertal 1976/1977 and Dortmund 1980
 João Cutileiro. Amantes, Centro Cultural São Lourenço, Almancil, Portugal, 1987
 João Cutileiro. Exposição antológica, Fundação Calouste Gulbenkian. Centro de Arte Moderna, Lisbon, Portugal 1990
 João Cutileiro. Cavaleiros - Homenagem a Paolo Uccello, Centro Cultural São Lourenço, Almancil, Portugal 1990
 João Cutileiro no Pico, Galeria Municipal das Lajes do Pico, Azores, 2011

Participations
 XV. São Paulo Art Biennial, São Paulo, 1979
 2nd Congress of the international organization for sculptors in Washington, D.C., 1980
 Arte Contemporânea - Colecção Marie e Volker Huber, with José de Guimarães, Antoni Tàpies, Günter Grass, Ingo Kühl, Wolf Vostell, Rainer Wölzl, Corneille among others, Convento Espírito Santo, Loulé, Portugal, 1989.

References

1937 births
2021 deaths
20th-century Portuguese sculptors
21st-century Portuguese sculptors
People from Lisbon
Male sculptors
20th-century male artists
21st-century male artists
Officers of the Order of Saint James of the Sword